Golasecca ( or ) is a town and  in the province of Varese, Lombardy (Northern Italy).

It has given its name to the Golasecca culture, a prehistoric civilization who lived in the Ticino River area from the Bronze Age until the 1st century BC.

References 

Municipalities of the Province of Varese
Golasecca culture
Archaeological sites in Lombardy